Bete language may refer to:
Bété language, a language of Ivory Coast
Bete language (Nigeria)
Bete-Bendi language